The E-meter, originally the electropsychometer, is an electronic device for displaying the electrodermal activity (EDA) of a human being. It is used for auditing in Scientology and divergent groups. The efficacy and legitimacy of Scientology's use of the E-meter has been subject to extensive litigation and in accordance with a federal court order, the Church of Scientology publishes disclaimers declaring that the E-meter "by itself does nothing", is incapable of improving health, and is used specifically for spiritual purposes.

Such devices have been used as research tools in many human studies, and as one of several components of the Leonarde Keeler's polygraph (lie detector) system, which has been widely criticized as ineffective and pseudoscientific by legal experts and psychologists.

History

Electrodermal activity (EDA) is the changing electrical charges observed on the surface of the skin. EDA meters were first developed in 1889 in Russia, and psychotherapists began using them as tools for therapy in the 1900s.

Volney Mathison built an EDA meter based on a Wheatstone bridge, a vacuum tube amplifier, and a large moving-coil meter that projected an image of the needle on the wall. He patented his device in 1954 as an electropsychometer or E-meter, and it came to be known as the "Mathison Electropsychometer". In Mathison's words, the E-meter "has a needle that swings back and forth across a scale when a patient holds on to two electrical contacts". Mathison recorded in his book, Electropsychometry, that the idea of the E-meter came to him in 1950 while listening to a lecture by L. Ron Hubbard:p. 64 
and

Hubbard told of that encounter in a 1952 recorded lecture:

Mathison began working with Hubbard in 1951 and that year filed application for his first E-meter patent, U.S. Patent 2,684,670. After the partnership broke up in 1954, Mathison continued improving his E-meters with additional patents, marketing them through his own company and publications, retaining many of the concepts and terms from his time with Hubbard.

In a separate line of development, EDA monitors were incorporated in polygraph machines by Leonarde Keeler. Rigorous testing of the polygraph has yielded mixed results, and some critics classify polygraph operation as a pseudoscience.

Scientology

The E-meter was adopted for use in Dianetics and Scientology when Mathison collaborated with Hubbard in 1951. Some sources say the E-meter was "developed by Volney Mathison following Hubbard's designs", or that Hubbard invented it. Hubbard falsely claimed to be the inventor of the E-meter, a claim which is in keeping with the Scientology stance that Hubbard is the "source", or "the only originator of all Dianetics and Scientology material".

The E-meter was not part of the early days of Dianetics and Scientology. Auditing was composed of conversation and not led by a mechanical device. Hubbard introduced an E-meter prototype during the 1952 Philadelphia Doctorate Course but did not introduce his transistorized version until several years later. The E-meter became "the principal material artifact" of Dianetics and Scientology from the 1960s onward.

In the book, L. Ron Hubbard, Messiah or Madman?, Bent Corydon wrote:

Though it seemed for a while that Scientology's more advanced techniques would serve without an E-meter, a few months later in May 1955, Hubbard wrote:

The Scientology meter was smaller, based on transistors rather than vacuum tubes, and powered by a low-voltage rechargeable battery rather than line voltage.

From then on, the E-meter was a required tool for Scientology ministers. The "Hubbard Mark II" E-meter was christened in 1960 and the Hubbard Mark III shortly after. On December 6, 1966, Hubbard won a patent on the Mark V version under the name "Hubbard Electropsychometer". Corydon wrote that the Hubbard E-meter was actually developed by Scientologists Don Breeding and Joe Wallis, though the patent does not list other developers.

Corydon's account was said to be based on the memoirs of Hubbard's son, Ronald DeWolf, but in 1987, DeWolf sued the publisher to prevent publication and swore an affidavit repudiating everything in the book.

The Scientology E-meter has been redesigned and re-patented several times since its first introduction to Dianetics (e.g.: ,).

In 1969, Scientology was accepted as a religion by the Court of Appeal and declared that the E-meter was useful in "bona fide religious counseling". District Court Judge Gesell, while denying medical validity to the device, returned the e-meter to the Church. All e-meters from this point forward had to be inscribed with a disclaimer that it was not for medical or scientific diagnoses, treatment or prevention of any disease. The church reformulated the disclaimer into: "The Hubbard electrometer is a religious artifact. By itself, this meter does nothing. It is for religious use by students and Ministers of the church in Confessionals and pastoral counseling only."

Modern applications

EDA meters are used in both therapist-patient and bio-feedback settings. EDA is one of the factors recorded by polygraphs, and EDA meters are often used in human studies to gauge psychological responses.

Scientology
E-meters are used in Scientology and Dianetics by Scientology ministers known as "auditors". Scientology materials traditionally refer to the subject as the "preclear", although auditors continue to use the meter on subjects who are well beyond the "clear" level. The auditor gives the preclear a series of commands or questions while the preclear holds a pair of cylindrical electrodes ("cans") connected to the meter, and the auditor notes both the verbal response and the activity of the meter. Auditor training includes familiarization with a number of characteristic needle movements, each with a specific significance. Religion scholar Dorthe Refslund Christensen describes the e-meter as "a technical device that could help the auditor locate engrams and areas of change when auditing a preclear".

Scientology concepts associated with the E-meter and its use are regarded by the scientific and medical communities as pseudoscience, and the E-meter has never been subjected to clinical trials as a therapeutic tool.

Scientologists claim that in the hands of a trained operator, the meter can indicate whether a person has been relieved from the spiritual impediment of past experiences. In accordance with a 1974 federal court order, the Church of Scientology asserts that the E-meter is intended for use only in church-sanctioned auditing sessions; it is not a curative or medical device. The E-meters used by the Church were previously manufactured by Scientologists at their Gold Base facility, but now are manufactured in Hong Kong and Taiwan.

According to Hubbard, the E-meter is used by the operator for three vital functions:
 To determine what process to run and what to run it on.
 To observe how well the process is running.
 To know when the process should be stopped.
The Church claims that the E-meter can be used to assess the emotion charge of single words, whole sentences, and questions, as well as indicating the general state of the subject when the operator is not speaking. Few users of the E-meter claim that it does anything to the subject. To most, it does no more than suggest to the operator a change of mental, emotional, or parasympathetic nervous state or activity.

New religious movement scholar Douglas Cowan writes that Scientologists cannot progress along the Bridge to Total Freedom without an E-meter, and that Hubbard even told Scientologists to buy two E-meters, in the event that one of them fails to operate. According to anthropologist Roy Rappaport, the E-meter is a ritual object, an object that "stand[s] indexically for something intangible".

Functional description

One of E-meter's primary components is a Wheatstone bridge, an electrical circuit configuration invented in 1833 that enables the detection of very small differences between two electrical impedances (in this case, resistances). The E-meter is constructed so that one resistance is the subject's body and the other is a rheostat controlled by the operator. A small voltage from the battery is applied to electrodes held in the subjects hands. As the electrical properties (electrodermal activity) of the subject's body changes during the counseling, the resulting changes in the small electric current are displayed in needle movements on a large analog panel meter. The dial face is without numbers because the absolute resistance in ohms is relatively unimportant, while the operator watches primarily for characteristic needle motions. The voltage applied to the electrodes is less than 1.5 V, and the electric current through the subject's body is less than a half a milliampere.

In the Scientology E-meter, the large control, known as the "tone arm", adjusts the meter bias, while a smaller one controls the gain. The operator manipulates the tone arm to keep the needle near the center of the dial so its motion is easily observed. A simple E-meter powered by direct current, such as that used by the Scientologists and the like, displays several kinds of electrodermal activity (EDA) on the one dial without distinction, including changes in conductance, resistance, and bioelectric potential. Researchers in psychophysiology are also exploring admittance and impedance aspects of EDA that can be observed only with alternating current.

The E-Meter, measuring variations in electrodermal activity (which can be highly responsive to emotion), functions on the same physiological data sources as one of the parts of the polygraph, or “lie detector”. According to Scientology doctrine, the resistance corresponds to the "mental mass and energy" of the subject's mind, which are claimed to change when the subject thinks of particular mental images (engrams). One account tells about Hubbard using the E-meter to determine whether or not fruits can experience pain, as in his 1968 assertion that tomatoes "scream when sliced".

The traditional theory of EDA holds that skin resistance varies with the state of sweat glands in the skin. Sweating is controlled by the sympathetic nervous system, Because sweat contains electrolytes (salt, etc.), conductivity is increased when the sweat glands are activated. But some advocates argue that the meter responds more quickly than would be possible by the exudation and drying of sweat. They propose an additional mechanism termed the "Tarchanoff Response" through which the cerebral cortex of the brain affects the current directly. This phenomenon is not completely understood, and further research needs to be performed.

Law

United States

The medical establishment had been watching Hubbard's enterprises since 1951 when the New Jersey State Board of Medical Examiners prosecuted the Hubbard Dianetic Research Foundation (Elizabeth, New Jersey) for practicing medicine without a license. In 1958, the Food and Drug Administration (FDA) seized and destroyed 21,000 Dianazene tablets from Hubbard's Distribution Center, Inc., charging that they were falsely labeled as a treatment for radiation sickness.

On January 4, 1963, in service of an FDA complaint, more than 100 US marshals and deputized longshoremen with drawn guns raided the Founding Church of Scientology in Washington, D.C. and confiscated more than three tons of propertyp. 135 including 5,000 books, 2,900 booklets, and several hundred E-meters. The FDA accused the Church of making false medical claims that the E-meters could treat physical and mental illnesses. The FDA also charged that the meters did not bear adequate directions for treating the conditions for which they were recommended.

The Church claimed that they had not written any publication that the E-meter could or would heal anything,p. 136 and sued to get the property back. Years of litigation ensued. In the first trial beginning on April 3, 1967, the jury found that the Church misrepresented the E-meter and the judge ordered the confiscated materials destroyed. But in 1969, the US Court of Appeals for the District of Columbia reversed the verdict; the Church, it said, had made substantial showing that Scientology is a religion and the government had done nothing to rebut the claim. The US Court of Appeals wrote: 

Having found that Scientology was a religion, the Court wrote that the government was forbidden by the First Amendment of the Constitution to rule on the truth or falsity of the Church's doctrines and interfere with its practices, provided the claims are not manifestly insincere and the practices are reasonably harmless. The Court ordered a new trial with the mandate that the trial court could not forbid auditing, use of the E-meter, or purveyance of the literature within a religious context. The FDA appealed the decision, but in 1969, the US Supreme Court declined to review the case, commenting only that "Scientology meets the prima facie test of religion". In his 1973 judgment, District Court Judge Gerhard Gesell ruled that:Unable to do more under the mandate from the Court of Appeals, Judge Gesell ordered all the property to be returned to the Church, and thereafter, the E-meter may be used only in "bona fide religious counseling". All meters and referring literature must include a label disclaiming any medical benefits:

The church adopted a modified version of that statement, which it still invokes in connection with the E-meter. The current statement reads:

Judge Gesell also ordered the Church to pay all the government's legal fees and warehousing costs for the confiscated property for the nine years of litigation. He also required the church to pay the salaries and travel expenses of FDA agents who might, from time to time, inspect for compliance with the court's order.p. 143 The raid was ruled illegal, but the government retained copies of the documents.

Europe
In 1979 in Sweden, a court forbade calling the E-meter "an invaluable aid to measuring man's mental state and changes in it" in an advertisement. The prohibition was upheld by the European Commission of Human Rights in case X. and Church of Scientology v. Sweden.

In October 2009, a three-judge panel at the Correctional Court in Paris, France convicted the church and six of its members of organized fraud. The Court's decision followed a three-week trial, where two plaintiffs alleged they were defrauded by the organization. One plaintiff's complaint involved the use of an E-Meter by Scientologists with medical implications. This plaintiff claimed that, after being audited with the device, she was encouraged to pay tens of thousands of euros for vitamins, books, and courses to improve her condition. She argued that amounted to fraud. The Court agreed, and the ruling was upheld on appeal in 2013. See .

Australia

In 1964, the government of Victoria, Australia held a Board of Inquiry into Scientology which returned its findings in a document colloquially known as the Anderson Report. Psychiatrist Ian Holland Martin, honorary federal secretary of the Australian and New Zealand College of Psychiatrists, gave evidence that the E-Meter "used for Scientology" was a "psycho-galvano-meter" and was "dangerous in unqualified hands". He said that if the E-meter "was suggested to possess mysterious powers" to someone who did not understand that it had "been thoroughly discredited as a lie detector" then "that person would be suggestible to ideas foisted on him by the operator". The final report of the inquiry stated that the E-meter enabled Scientology

In 1965, Victoria banned the use of the E-meter without a license, with Western Australia and South Australia following suit. In 1969, the High Court of Western Australia ruled the ban illegal. South Australia repealed its law in 1973, and Victoria repealed it in 1982. In 1983, the High Court of Australia ruled that Scientology was a religion, and as such had the same rights and protections.

Scientology beliefs and theories
Within the Church of Scientology, the early psychoanalysts are credited with first use of the E-meter.

Hubbard credited Mathison with recreating the E-meter and bringing him the first model for use in Dianetics. Hubbard set out his theory of how the E-meter works in his book Understanding the E-Meter:

Hubbard claimed that this "mental mass" has the same physical characteristics, including weight, as mass as commonly understood by lay persons:

This text in Understanding the E-Meter is accompanied by three drawings. The first shows a man standing on a weighing scale, which reflects a weight of "150" (the units are not given). The next shows the man on the same scale, weighed down under a burden of "Mental Image Pictures", and the scale indicates a weight of "180". The last picture shows the man standing upright on the scale, now unburdened by "Mental Image Pictures" and with a smile on his face, while the scale again indicates a weight of "148".

Bob Thomas, senior executive of the church in the early 1970s, gave a prosaic description.

See also
Auditing (Scientology)
Biofeedback
Thought identification

References

External links

 Scientology Today: What is the E-Meter and how does it work?, official Church of Scientology description
 Secrets of Scientology: The E-Meter, by David S. Touretzky
 , filed by the Church of Spiritual Technology on May 9, 1996, and published January 4, 2000
 "New Religious Movements, Technology, and Science: The Conceptualization of the E-Meter in Scientology Teachings" Zygon: Journal of Religion and Science 51 (3):661-683 (2016), a thorough historical and critical study by scholar Stefano Bigliardi.

1951 introductions
Measuring instruments
Pseudoscience
Religious objects
Scientology beliefs and practices